Leonardo's Mountain of Clams and the Diet of Worms (1998) is the eighth volume of collected essays by the Harvard paleontologist Stephen Jay Gould. The essays were culled from his monthly column "The View of Life" in Natural History magazine, to which Gould contributed for 27 years. The book deals, in typically discursive fashion, with themes familiar to Gould's writing: evolution and its teaching, science biography, probabilities and common sense.

Reviews
Book Summary: by Lawrence N. Goeller
Book Review: by Jacqueline Boone, New York Times
The Royal Road of Science: by Bryan Appleyard, Spectator
Book review: by Jim Sullivan, Humanist
Review by Graham Brack, Renaissance
Book Review by Jim Walker
Book summary: by Ryan Robinson

External links
Profile Page (with introduction) - Unofficial Stephen Jay Gould Archive

1998 non-fiction books
American essay collections
Books by Stephen Jay Gould
English-language books
Works originally published in Natural History (magazine)